Yoni Freedhoff is an associate professor of family medicine at the University of Ottawa. In 2004, he became the founder and medical director of the Bariatric Medical Institute which provides non-surgical weight management. He is one of Canada's most outspoken obesity experts. He is also a popular video blogger; his YouTube channel is The Diet Fix: Why Diets Fail and How to Make Yours Work. In 2014, he published a book under the same title.

Education
Freedhoff graduated with honours from the University of Toronto medical school. He received the Betty Stewart Sisam award which is given to the student who "has shown the greatest human understanding and care for the welfare and health of patients". He was board certified in March 2005 for bariatric medicine and was one of only three physicians in Canada to be board certified by the ABBM.

Recognitions
In 2007 he was recognized by the Canadian Obesity Network as a national obesity expert. In 2010, he served as the first Family Medicine Chair for this organization. In 2011 the University of Ottawa appointed him an Assistant Professor of Family Medicine. The Canadian Medical Association Journal once dubbed him a Canadian "nutrition watchdog."

Organizations
In 2010, Freedhoff helped to co-found Reality Coalition Canada, a non-profit group of diverse Canadian experts whose mission is to promote evidence-based obesity prevention and treatment policies and messages.

The Diet Fix
His first book, The Diet Fix: Why Diets Fail and How to Make Yours Work, was published by Random House Crown Harmony in March 2014. A National Post review of the book said that Freedhoff uses "real research, not pseudoscience, along with a healthy dose of common sense gleaned from practical experience."

A review by Newsday described the book's concept of "post-traumatic dieting disorder", which includes feelings like guilt and depression that may occur after failed dieting attempts. A Scientific American review said that "this is not your average diet book" and noted that Freedhoff begins with a prescription for some chocolate. The review said that Freedhoff touches on the "toxic, obesogenic environment" of the modern world, but it lamented the fact that Freedhoff does not go into more detail on that aspect of the dieting problem.

Other work
Freedhoff writes an award-winning blog, Weighty Matters. It has been ranked the world's top health blog by the blog ranking service Technorati. He also writes a weekly column for U.S. News & World Report and he is a guest blogger with Psychology Today and at the Huffington Post. He has co-authored a medical textbook on managing obesity in the office called Best Weight: A practical guide to office-based weight management.

In 2012, Freedhoff was invited and then uninvited by the Ontario Medical Association to give a talk before food industry executives on nutrition policy. When the group informed him that the food industry representatives did not want him to appear, Freedhoff completed his talk and published it on YouTube.

Freedhoff was a critic of Health Check, a nutritional certification program operated by the Heart and Stroke Foundation of Canada. He criticized the program for having endorsed products with high sodium and/or sugar contents.

Personal life
Freedhoff was born in Toronto, Ontario, Canada, the son of theoretical physicist Helen Freedhoff and chartered accountant Stephen Freedhoff, and brother of Michal Freedhoff. He is married to social worker Stacy Segal, and they have three children.

References

External links

University of Toronto alumni
Academic staff of the University of Ottawa
Canadian general practitioners
Canadian Jews
Obesity researchers
Living people
Diet food advocates
Year of birth missing (living people)
21st-century Canadian physicians